The 2020 FIA World Cup for Cross-Country Rallies was set to be the 28th season of the FIA World Cup for Cross-Country Rallies; an annual rally raid competition for cars, buggies, side-by-sides, and trucks held in multiple countries. Due to COVID-19 pandemic all events but one were cancelled, and FIA considered that only one event wasn't enough to award a World title and cancelled the season.

Calendar
The original calendar for the 2020 edition of the world cup featured five events; four cross-country rallies and one cross-country marathon; the Silk Way Rally, which was included for the first time. Four events on the schedule are shared with the 2020 FIM Cross-Country Rallies World Championship; the Qatar round being the only exception.

Regulation Changes
Starting with the 2020 season the vehicle classes have been reorganized into the following classifications:
T1.1 - 4x4 Prototype Cross-Country Vehicles - Petrol and Diesel
T1.2 - 4x2 Prototype Cross-Country Vehicles - Petrol and Diesel
T2 - Series Production Cross Country Vehicles
T3 - Improved Lightweight Prototypes Cross Country Vehicles
T4 - Improved Lightweight Series Side by Side Cross Country Vehicles
T5 - Cross Country Trucks

The FIA awards the world cup to drivers, co-drivers, and teams competing in the T1 category; whilst drivers and teams in the T3 and T4 categories are awarded FIA cups. The T2 production class will no longer be awarded an end of season trophy. Likewise, the T5 'truck' category is recognized, but not awarded any end-of-season cup or trophy.

Notable teams and drivers

Results
T2, T4 and T5 categories had no competitors in the only event held.

Overall

T1 category

T3 category

References

External links 
 

Cross Country Rally World Cup
World Cup for Cross-Country Rallies
FIA World Cup, 2020